Mulena Yomuhulu Mbumu wa Litunga Ngombala was a Great Chief of the Lozi people in Zambia, in Africa.

Biography
Ngombala was a younger son of the Chief Ngalama and was adopted by Imamba.

He succeeded on the death of his elder brother, Yeta II Nalute.

Ngombala had married Notulu I (who was later starved to death), daughter of Mwiyawamatende and Matondo. He died at N'gundu and is buried there.

His children were Prince Mbanga and Chieftess Notulu II and his grandson was King Mwanawina I.

References

Litungas